Massacre is an Argentine alternative rock band formed in 1986 in Buenos Aires. It was formed by high school students influenced by American and British bands of the early 80s Alternative Rock movement. Among his influences, artists like Hüsker Dü, TSOL, Dead Kennedys, Black Flag, Nirvana, The Cure, Guns N' Roses, The Ramones, T. Rex, Sumo, Gustavo Cerati, Luis Alberto Spinetta, among others. Taking cues from the Underground rock scene in the United States, they gained notoriety at the time for being an entirely independent group that self-managed its affairs, as well as producing and distributing its own records (attitudes which were still fairly foreign to Latin American rock bands of the era). This helped pave way for the cult status that the band still enjoys within and outside their native Argentina.

Originally known as Massacre Palestina, they decided to change their name in 1992, in the wake of the attack on the Embassy of Israel, in order to avoid potential censure and controversy.

Discography

See also 
Latino punk

References

External links 

Argentine rock music groups
Argentine punk rock groups
Argentine alternative rock groups
Skate punk groups
Musical groups established in 1986